A serial killer is typically a person who murders three or more people, with the murders taking place over more than a month and including a significant period of time between them. The Federal Bureau of Investigation (FBI) defines serial killing as "a series of two or more murders, committed as separate events, usually, but not always, by one offender acting alone".

Identified serial killers

See also
 Lists of serial killers

References

Bibliography

 
 
 
 
 

 
Serial killers

Serial France